It's a Wise Child is a 1931 American pre-Code comedy film directed by Robert Z. Leonard and written by Laurence E. Johnson. The film stars Marion Davies, Sidney Blackmer, James Gleason, Polly Moran and Lester Vail. The film was released on April 11, 1931, by Metro-Goldwyn-Mayer.

Cast 
Marion Davies as Joyce Stanton
Sidney Blackmer as Steve
James Gleason as Cool Kelly
Polly Moran as Bertha
Lester Vail as Roger Baldwin
Marie Prevost as Annie Ostrom
Clara Blandick as Mrs. Stanton
Robert McWade as G. A. Appleby
Johnny Arthur as Otho Peabody
Hilda Vaughn as Alice Peabody
Ben Alexander as Bill Stanton
Emily Fitzroy as Jane Appleby

References

External links 
 

1931 films
American comedy films
1931 comedy films
Metro-Goldwyn-Mayer films
Films directed by Robert Z. Leonard
American black-and-white films
1930s English-language films
1930s American films